K. Frederick Paradesi Babu is the current President of the Protestant Andhra Evangelical Lutheran Church Society. He had his ministerial formation at the Andhra Christian Theological College, Hyderabad, a Seminary affiliated to the nation's first university, the Senate of Serampore College (University).

Paradesi Babu happens to be the present Chairperson of the Board of Governors of his alma mater, the Andhra Christian Theological College, Hyderabad, a near-ecumenical (Catholics excluded) Protestant Regional Seminary managed by the following multi-State Church societies, namely,

 Andhra Pradesh-based Protestant Church societies
 Andhra Evangelical Lutheran Church Society headquartered in Guntur,
 Church of South India, Dioceses of Krishna-Godavari, Nandyal, Rayalaseema headquartered in Machilipatnam, Nandyal and Kadapa respectively,
 Convention of Baptist Churches of Northern Circars Society headquartered in Kakinada,
 Samavesam of Telugu Baptist Churches Society, headquartered in Nellore,
 South Andhra Lutheran Church Society, headquartered in Tirupati,
 Tamil Nadu-based Protestant Church society
 Church of South India, Diocese of Madras (in Tamil Nadu State) headquartered in Chennai,
 Telangana-based Protestant Church societies
 Church of South India Dioceses of Dornakal, Karimnagar, Medak headquartered in Dornakal, Karimnagar and Medak respectively,
 Good Samaritan Evangelical Lutheran Church Society headquartered in Bhadrachalam,
 Methodist Church in India, Hyderabad Regional Conference, headquartered in Hyderabad,

References

Further reading
 
 
 
 
 
 
 

Indian Lutherans
Indian Christian theologians
Telugu people
Christian clergy from Andhra Pradesh
20th-century Indian translators
Senate of Serampore College (University) alumni